KSC Commercial Internet (KSC) was founded in 1994 as a joint venture between Internet Knowledge Service Center (IKSC) and the Communications Authority of Thailand.

KSC was the first commercial Internet Service Provider in Thailand. The year that followed KSC played a major role in building Thailand's internet infrastructure. In 2008 KSC increase the ability of the company to invest as Internet Service and Business Solution Provider.

References

External links 
 KSC website
 KSC webmail

Telecommunications companies of Thailand
Internet service providers of Thailand
Telecommunications companies established in 1994
1994 establishments in Thailand